Decatur (dɪˈkeɪtə(r)) is the largest city and county seat of Morgan County (with a portion also in Limestone County) in the U.S. state of Alabama. Nicknamed "The River City", it is located in northern Alabama on the banks of Wheeler Lake, along the Tennessee River. The population in 2020 was 57,938.

Decatur is the core city of the two-county large Decatur metropolitan area, which had an estimated population of 156,494 in 2020. Combined with the Huntsville Metropolitan Area, the two create the Huntsville-Decatur Combined Statistical Area, of which Decatur is the second-largest city.

Like many southern cities in the early 19th century, Decatur's early success was based upon its location along a river. Railroad routes and boating traffic pushed the city to the front of North Alabama's economic atmosphere. The city rapidly grew into a large economic center within the Tennessee Valley and was a hub for travelers and cargo between Nashville and Mobile, as well as Chattanooga and New Orleans. Throughout the 20th century, the city experienced steady growth, but was eclipsed as the regional economic center by the fast-growing Huntsville during the space race. Decatur now finds its economy heavily based on manufacturing, mining, cargo transit, chemical, and high-tech companies such as Vulcan Materials, Daikin, Toray, and United Launch Alliance.

History

Initially, the area was known as "Rhodes Ferry Landing", named for Dr. Henry W. Rhodes, an early landowner who operated a ferry that crossed the Tennessee River in the 1810s at the present-day location of Rhodes Ferry Park. The city was incorporated as Decatur in 1821. It was named in honor of Stephen Decatur; after he was killed in a duel in 1820, President Monroe directed that the Alabama town be named for him.

In the early 1830s, Decatur was the eastern terminus of the Tuscumbia, Courtland and Decatur Railroad, the first railway built west of the Appalachian Mountains. In 1850 the Tuscumbia, Courtland and Decatur was incorporated into the Memphis & Charleston Railroad.

Because of its location on the Tennessee River at the strategically important crossing of two major railroads, Decatur was the site of several encounters during the American Civil War. When the Union Army occupied the city early in the war, the commanding general ordered all but four buildings in the town destroyed. Bricks from some of the churches in town were used to build stoves and chimneys for the buildings that housed soldiers. The four buildings that remained (and are still standing) are the Old State Bank, the Dancy-Polk House, the Todd House, and the Burleson-Hinds-McEntire House. After the Union victory in the Battle of Atlanta, a Confederate army under the command of General John Bell Hood briefly sparred with a vastly outmanned garrison during the 1864 Battle of Decatur, when the city was referred to as "A Tough Nut to Crack."

While the city was under Confederate control, plans for the Battle of Shiloh were mapped out within the Burleson-Hinds-McEntire House. These activities make the house one of the most historic buildings in Decatur.

New Decatur was a city that rose out of the ashes of former Decatur west of the railroad tracks. New Decatur was founded in 1887 and incorporated in 1889. However, residents of the older Decatur resented the new town, founded and occupied by people who moved down from northern states. Animosity built until New Decatur renamed their town "Albany", after Albany, New York, in September 1916. The impetus to meld the two towns came from the need for a bridge, instead of a ferry, across the Tennessee River. The Decatur Kiwanis Club was formed with an equal number of members from each town to organize efforts to get the state to build the bridge. In 1925, the two cities merged to form one City of Decatur. There is a noticeable difference between the two sides of town. The cities developed differently at different times, and still to this day have somewhat different cultures. Eastern portions of Decatur tend to act more suburban and traditional, while western portions tend to look more metropolitan and contemporary.

The Old State Bank, on the edge of downtown, is the oldest bank building in the State of Alabama, being 190 years old. The first wave pool in the United States was built in Decatur and is still in operation at the Point Mallard Aquatic Center. The city has the largest Victorian era home district in the state of Alabama. Decatur is also home to Alabama's oldest opera house, the Cotaco Opera House, which still stands on Johnston Street.

In the past, its industries included repair shops of the Louisville and Nashville Railroad, car works, engine works, bottling plants, and manufacturers of lumber, sashes and blinds, tannic acid, fertilizers, cigars, flour, cottonseed oil, and various other products.

Geography
The Tennessee River has traditionally been the northern border of the city and Morgan County, but a small portion of the city extends across the river into Limestone County between U.S. 31 and I-65. Major bodies of water in the city include Wheeler Lake on the Tennessee River itself, plus Flint Creek, and Dry Branch, tributaries of the Tennessee River. The city extends to the other side of Flint Creek and the Refuge in the Indian Hills and Burningtree subdivision areas.

The northern portion of Decatur sits on top of a short hill that overlooks the Tennessee River; this creates a very steep dropoff to the river shore at Rhodes Ferry Park. This hill allows the "Steamboat Bill" Memorial Bridge to leave the mainland at grade without any major sloping required to cross the river while not interfering with Decatur's heavy barge traffic.

South past the 14th St. and 6th Ave. intersection, land remains flat. South, and also west, past S.R. 67 there are a few minor ridges that sit within the city limits.

Climate
Decatur has a humid subtropical climate (Köppen Cfa) with four distinct seasons.

On average, the low temperature falls to the freezing mark or below on 59 days a year, and to or below  on 9.2 days. Winters usually do not produce much snow; a large amount of snow is rare within the city limits. A small, measurable amount of snow can be experienced a few times each year. It tied for the most since 1963. There are 51–52 days of + highs annually and 1.7 days of + highs. Thunderstorms are common during the summer months. The latter part of summer tends to be drier. Autumn, which spans from mid-September to early-December, tends to be similar to spring in terms of temperature and precipitation, although it begins relatively dry.

Precipitation averages about 53.4 inches per year and on average, is relatively (and uniformly) heavy from November to July, with December the single wettest month on average; August through October are slightly drier months on average. Occasionally, severe thunderstorms occur. These storms can produce damaging winds and large hail in addition to the usual hazards of lightning and very heavy rain. There is also the risk of tornadoes. Severe thunderstorms can occur at any time of the year, but are most common during the spring months. A secondary severe weather season peaks in November. Occasionally from July to October, the Decatur area experiences strong winds and/or heavy to excessive rain from tropical disturbances. These commonly make landfall along the Gulf Coast as hurricanes but lose intensity as they move inland.

Neighboring cities/towns
 Athens (north) - Limestone County
 Hartselle (south) - Morgan County
 Hillsboro (west) - Lawrence County
 Huntsville (northeast) - Madison/Limestone counties
 Madison (northeast) - Madison/Limestone counties (however Huntsville completely separates the two)
 Mooresville (northeast) - Limestone County
 Moulton (southwest) - Lawrence County
 Priceville (east) - Morgan County
 Trinity (west) - Morgan County

Neighborhoods
Decatur is divided into four different regions of town (Northeast, Southeast, Northwest, Southwest). Southeast and Northeast Decatur lie east of the CSX Railroad's mainline. North of Lee Street, the dividing line is Bank Street which runs a block east of and parallel to the railroad. Northeast and Southeast and are divided by Moulton Street. Southwest consists of the area west of the CSX Railroad and south of Moulton Street. Northwest is bordered by Moulton Street, the CSX Railroad from Moulton Street to Lee Street and then by Bank Street from Lee Street to the Tennessee River. While there are few major cultural differences between the East and the West, minute differences such as street grid patterns, zoning patterns, and architectural styles are noticeable.

Northwest
West Decatur (the portion north of Moulton Street)

Northeast
Albany (New Decatur)
Downtown Decatur
East Acres
Old Decatur
Bank Street and Second Avenue (Downtown Shopping District)
Harborview (Riverfront)
Irvington (Limestone County)
Whiteside (Limestone County)

Southeast
Bayside
Brookmeade
Burleson Mountain
Burningtree Mountain
Cedar Lake
Fairview
Flint
Hickory Hills
Indian Hills
Point Mallard Estates

Southwest
Autumn Ridge
Austinville
Basham
Braswell
Cedar Ridge
Chapel Hill
Chula Vista
City View Estates
Deerfoot Estates
Dogwood Estates
Dunbarton
Flint
Graystone
Griffin Addition
Longleaf Estates
Moulton Heights
Oak Lea
Oakworth
Timberlake
Russell Village
Vestavia
West Decatur (the portion south of Moulton Street)
Westmeade
Woodtrail

Demographics

2000 census
As of the census of 2000, there were 53,929 people, 21,824 households, and 14,753 families residing in the city. The racial makeup of the city was 75.50% White, 19.56% Black or African American, 0.58% Native American, 0.70% Asian, 0.13% Pacific Islander, 2.22% from other races, and 1.33% from two or more races. 5.64% of the population were Hispanic or Latino of any race.

There were 21,824 households, out of which 31.8% had children under the age of 18 living with them, 50.7% were married couples living together, 13.4% had a female householder with no husband present, and 32.4% were non-families. 28.9% of all households were made up of individuals, and 10.7% had someone living alone who was 65 years of age or older. The average household size was 2.43 and the average family size was 2.99.

In the city, the population was spread out, with 25.4% under the age of 18, 8.8% from 18 to 24, 29.6% from 25 to 44, 23.1% from 45 to 64, and 13.1% who were 65 years of age or older. The median age was 36 years. For every 100 females, there were 92.4 males. For every 100 females age 18 and over, there were 89.5 males.

The median income for a household in the city was $37,192, and the median income for a family was $47,574. Males had a median income of $37,108 versus $22,471 for females. The per capita income for the city was $20,431. About 11.9% of families and 14.9% of the population were below the poverty line, including 21.2% of those under age 18 and 11.1% of those age 65 or over.

2010 census
As of the census of 2010, there were 55,683 people, 22,576 households, and 14,918 families residing in the city. The racial makeup of the city was 66.5% White, 21.7% Black or African American, 0.7% Native American, 0.9% Asian, 0.1% Pacific Islander, 7.9% from other races, and 2.2% from two or more races. 12.4% of the population were Hispanic or Latino of any race.

There were 22,576 households, out of which 28.7% had children under the age of 18 living with them, 46.0% were married couples living together, 15.6% had a female householder with no husband present, and 33.9% were non-families. 29.9% of all households were made up of individuals, and 11.4% had someone living alone who was 65 years of age or older. The average household size was 2.42 and the average family size was 2.99.

In the city, the population was spread out, with 24.1% under the age of 18, 9.0% from 18 to 24, 26.1% from 25 to 44, 26.3% from 45 to 64, and 14.5% who were 65 years of age or older. The median age was 37.9 years. For every 100 females, there were 92.7 males. For every 100 females age 18 and over, there were 96.2 males.

The median income for a household in the city was $43,090, and the median income for a family was $55,158. Males had a median income of $42,146 versus $27,477 for females. The per capita income for the city was $23,615. About 12.8% of families and 17.5% of the population were below the poverty line, including 28.3% of those under age 18 and 11.1% of those age 65 or over.

2020 census

As of the 2020 United States census, there were 57,938 people, 22,113 households, and 13,802 families residing in the city.

Economy
Decatur has grown to be the busiest river port on the Tennessee River. The Port of Decatur sees large amounts of barge traffic from up and down the Tennessee River, which has led to twelve Fortune 500 companies opening plants in the city. Major employers include General Electric, 3M, Wayne Farms, United Launch Alliance, Nucor, Bunge Limited, Daikin, Hyosung, Ascend Performance Materials, and the Tennessee Valley Authority.

Decatur is also known as the "Home of Meow Mix", after the company bought a  facility in town, and now utilizes its riverfront property to ship the finished product up and down the Tennessee River.

Being part of the Huntsville-Decatur CSA, the city lies within the region having the most engineers per capita in the nation.

A recent BRAC Base realignment will bring a population, conservatively estimated at 5,000−10,000 people (not including their families), to the area surrounding Redstone Arsenal.

Approval of the United Launch Alliance combined Lockheed-Martin and Boeing's rocket manufacturing contracts to a central location at the plant in Decatur. All satellite launching rockets used by the U.S. government will be built in Decatur. This approval brought over 230 new jobs to the Decatur area. The ULA plant utilizes the Tennessee River to ship the rockets to Cape Canaveral.

In March 2008, a $1.3 billion development, including a Bass Pro Shops was announced for the Interstate 65/Interstate 565 interchange inside the city limits. A school, fire department, parks and lakes were expected to support the future development. As of Spring 2010, this project still seems to be on the horizon, but there is no set date for the project to start. As of 2012, Bass Pro Shop has removed Decatur from its list of stores "Coming Soon" on its webpage. In 2013, Mayor Don Kyle announced that the "Sweet Water" complex was back on track, but has not announced whether Bass Pro Shops will be involved or not. Research from the Franklin Center for Government and Public Integrity suggests that the economic impact of Bass Pro Shops is typically limited despite the large subsidies the company often receives.

Tourism

Tourism is a major part of Decatur's economy. Hundreds of thousands of people from in and out of town, and from many other countries and territories, attend some of the premier festivals in the South.

The Alabama Jubilee, begun in 1978, is the oldest hot air balloon race south of the Kentucky Derby's Great Balloon Race (from 1973). With visiting populations rising into 100,000, people crowd around more than 60 seven-story-tall balloons as they inflate. Because of the Alabama Jubilee, Decatur has been named "The Ballooning Capital of Alabama" by the Alabama State Legislature.

The Spirit of America Festival is one of the largest free Fourth of July festivals in the south. More than 65,000 people arrive in Decatur to watch annual celebrations and the Miss Spirit of America beauty pageant. The contest was known as "Miss Point Mallard" from 1976 through 2013. It moved to the Princess Theatre in 2014.

Another large event in Decatur and North Alabama, the Racking Horse World Celebration attracts horses from around the world to compete in the largest Racking Horse competition. Held in the Celebration Arena near Priceville, the celebration draws up to 75,000 fans and competitors each year.

The Riverfest barbeque cook-off at Ingalls Harbor is sanctioned by the Kansas City Barbeque Society and attracts competitors from across the country. Beginning in 1995, the festival has previously been selected as a top ten tourist event in the State of Alabama, festival goers can expect live, nationally known musical acts, children's activities, and award-winning barbeque. Proceeds benefit the local community including several charitable organizations.

2018 saw the opening of the Cook Museum of Natural Science located at 133 Fourth Avenue NE Decatur, Alabama 35601 and showcases a wide variety of native animal and plant species within a state of the art facility. Cook Museum of Natural Science has been nominated by USA Today in their 2020 10 Best Readers' Choice travel awards as one of the best new museums to open in the past two years. Cook Museum of Natural Science is the newspaper's only Alabama-based nominee.

Parks and recreation

Delano Park - Founded in 1887, the 28 acre Delano Park (pronounced DELL-uh-no) is Morgan County's oldest city park in continuous operation and an oasis in the heart of historic Decatur. At 125 years old, the park is recognized as a designed historic landscape and is listed on the National Historic Register.

Government

The current mayor of Decatur is Tab Bowling, who was elected in 2016 The city has a five-member/district City Council. The current members are:

District 1  Billy Jackson
District 2  Kyle Dukes Pike
District 3  Carlton McMasters
District 4  Hunter Pepper
District 5  Jacob Ladner (Council President)

There are also many boards and commissions run by the city, supervising schools, planning, downtown development, and so on.

Past mayors and city councilmen
Past Decatur mayors include:
 Tab Bowling (2016-current)
 Don Stanford (2008–2012)
 Don Kyle (2004–2008; 2012-2016)
 Lynn Fowler (2000–2004)
 Julian Price (1994–2000)
 Bill Dukes (1976–1994)
 Russell Bolding (1972–1976)
 J. Gilmer Blackburn (1962–1968)
 H.R. Summer (1952–1954)

 Charles Kirby was appointed in 2011 after Ronny Russell resigned.

In city elections (preliminary) on August 23, 2016, the preliminary election resulted in runoff of Don Kyle and Tab Bowling for Mayor with Jeremy Goforth, Reggie Jackson and Butch Matthews not receiving enough vote to make the runoff.

Tab Bowling defeated Don Kyle (Oct 6, 2016) with 75% of the vote.

Education

Austin High and Decatur High are the two main high schools of the city. With the addition of the International Baccalaureate Program to Austin and Decatur High Schools, Decatur has become the first Alabama school system north of Birmingham and one of five in the state to offer the honors program for juniors and seniors (as of July 2006).

Public schools

High schools
Austin High School
Decatur High School

Middle schools
Decatur Middle School
Austin Middle School
Austin Junior High

Private schools
Decatur Heritage Christian Academy
Cornerstone Christian School
Faith Christian Academy (K-12) (SACS & ACSI)
St. Ann's Catholic School (K-8)

Higher education
Alabama Center for the Arts
Calhoun Community College System 
Strayer University

Media

Newspapers
The Decatur Daily has been the only major newspaper based in the Decatur Metropolitan Area since 1912, and one of the few family owned newspapers in Alabama. It has an average daily circulation of 20,824 and a Sunday circulation of 23,840. The paper circulates in the morning to an area that includes Morgan County, Lawrence County, and Limestone County, and parts of Cullman County, and Winston County.

The Huntsville Times is the only other newspaper with a larger circulation in the Huntsville-Decatur Combined Statistical Area, and has been in circulation since 1996 to most area counties, when the Huntsville News closed. Before then, the News was the morning paper, and the Times was the afternoon paper. After the News closed, the Times remained an afternoon paper until 2004.

Cable/Phone
Spectrum, AT&T and WOW! offer cable TV to Decatur. AT&T, Spectrum and WOW! offer phone service to Decatur. With AT&T, Huntsville and Madison are local calls (Madison County only), but Athens is long distance. Decatur comes within  of Athens and touches Huntsville. AT&T has begun rolling out their fiber network as of 2018.

Infrastructure

Transportation

Air
Decatur is served by two major airports. The Huntsville International Airport, in suburban Huntsville is the second busiest airport in Alabama, behind Birmingham International Airport. The city is also served by the busiest regional airport in Alabama, the Pryor Field Regional Airport.

Roads

Decatur's main thoroughfares are U.S. Route 31 (6th Avenue), U.S. Route 72 Alternate (S.R. 20), State Route 24, and State Route 67. 6th Avenue begins as both U.S. 72 Alternate and U.S. 31, and the two routes split after being carried by the twin-span "Steamboat Bill" Hudson Memorial Bridge that crosses the Tennessee River at the north central part of town. SR 20/Alternate U.S. 72 continues west towards The Shoals and Florence. U.S. 31 connects the city to Athens in the north, and Cullman in the south. A portion of S.R. 67 is known as Beltline Road, and serves as a partial beltway around the city. Interstate 65 runs east of the city, and connects the area to Nashville in the north and Birmingham in the south. Interstate 565 begins in Limestone County northeast of the city, and connects to Huntsville. Transforming U.S. 72 Alternate into an extension of Interstate 565 into the city has been discussed in the past.

Major highways
 Interstate 65
 Interstate 565
 U.S. Highway 31
 U.S. Highway 72 Alternate
 SR 20
 SR 24
 SR 67

Water (River)
Large shipments can move from Decatur to the Atlantic Ocean via the Tennessee River to the Mississippi River and the Gulf of Mexico. The United States builds some of its space launch vehicles in Decatur (United Launch Alliance vehicles only), and ships them to both Cape Canaveral and Vandenberg Air Force Base via this water route.

Rail
Decatur has two railroads, the Norfolk Southern Railway, and CSX Transportation (CSX) main line, the S&NA North Subdivision (Nashville to Birmingham). CSX operates a yard downtown. Norfolk Southern main line is the Memphis District East End. The line runs from Sheffield, Alabama, to Chattanooga, Tennessee. The rest of the line, west of Sheffield to Memphis, Tennessee, is the Memphis District West End. The line receives trackage rights in Stevenson, Alabama, from CSX on their Chattanooga Subdivision to Chattanooga.

Until 1971 the Decatur Union Depot was served by several Louisville and Nashville trains (Humming Bird, Pan-American and South Wind) originating in Chicago or Cincinnati and terminating at New Orleans or Miami, Florida, to the south. Amtrak from 1971 until 1979 operated the Floridian that made a station stop in Decatur. The Southern Railway's Tennessean served points to the east and west. The station is now a municipal museum.

Public safety

The Public Safety Department consists of the Decatur Police Department and Decatur Fire & Rescue. The Public Safety annex is located at 4119 Old Highway 31 in the Flint Community at the south end of the city and houses the Fire Department's administrative offices. This is also the site of the fire and police training facilities. The Police and Fire Departments currently cover approx.  in and around the city. Both the Decatur Police and Decatur Fire & Rescue are dispatched by the Morgan County E-911 Center.

The Decatur Police Department consists of approx. 140 officers, assigned to 4 divisions (Operations, Management Services, Criminal Investigations, & Administration). The current Chief of Police is Nate Allen.

Decatur Fire & Rescue is an Advanced Life Support, full service department consisting of approx. 115 firefighters. The department currently runs 6 Engine Companies (with 3 in reserve), 2 Ladder Companies, 1 Heavy Rescue (which also responds as part of AL-TF3), 1 Brush Truck, 1 HazMat Unit, 1 Battalion Chief Vehicle, and several other staff and support vehicles out of 8 Fire Stations. The current Fire Chief is Tracy Thornton.

Decatur is also home to the Morgan County Rescue Squad, an all volunteer organization, who responds to water, cave and high angle rope rescues all throughout Morgan County. They operate multiple land vehicles, 4 response boats and several smaller vessels out of 1 station (also located in Flint) and 2 boat houses on the Tennessee River, with approximately  30-40 members.

Emergency medical services and healthcare
Decatur is served by First Response EMS, which began operations in July 2012. First Response is a private company contracted through the city of Decatur to provide emergency medical services. Air Evac Lifeteam provides aeromedical services for the city of Decatur and North Alabama.

Decatur is served by two hospitals, Decatur General Hospital and Parkway Medical Center. Decatur General Hospital is a 273-bed, general acute care hospital and a 64-bed behavioral medicine hospital making it the third largest employer in Morgan County. Decatur General is accredited by the Joint Commission and its medical staff consists of more than 200 physicians representing 20 specialties. Decatur General Hospital is designated as a level two trauma center by the Alabama Department of Public Health. Parkway Medical Center is a 120-bed hospital that is designated as a level three trauma center by the Alabama Department of Public Health. As of January 1, 2012, Huntsville Hospital is the full owner of Parkway Medical Center. Parkway was formally a private not-for-profit hospital until their purchase from the public Huntsville Hospital System. Huntsville Hospital is the region's referral center and also serves as North Alabama's level one trauma center. As of November 2010, Decatur General Hospital and Huntsville Hospital are affiliate hospitals, ensuring the continued tradition and excellence of public, not-for-profit health care in North Alabama.

Notable people

Joseph Abbott, Texas politician
Richard W. Austin, U.S. congressman
Cynthia Bailey, model (Real Housewives of Atlanta)
Loren C. Ball, amateur astronomer, discoverer of asteroid 34351 Decatur
Taye Biddle, professional football player
Lucas Black, actor
Alonzo Boone, Negro league baseball player
Marv Breeding, former Major League Baseball second baseman
Cedrick Bridgeforth, methodist bishop
Deonte Brown, former University of Alabama lineman and national champion
Anna Laura Bryan, Miss Alabama 2012
Rufus Columbus Burleson, president of Baylor University from 1851 to 1861 and 1886 to 1897
Charlie Burse, blues musician, noted for his skill playing a ukulele
Kendrick Burton, former professional football defensive lineman
Jason Carthen, former professional football player and public speaker
David Charles, neurologist
Grace Curzon, Marchioness Curzon of Kedleston, second wife of Lord Curzon, Viceroy of India
Pop Gates, former professional basketball player and member of the Harlem Globetrotters
Chad Girodo, MLB pitcher
Eugene C. Gordon, founder of Decatur Land Improvement and Furnace Company
Micky Hammon, member of the Alabama House of Representatives
Christopher Columbus Harris, U.S. congressman from 1914 to 1915
Robin Henderson, Associate Director, Management, of the NASA Marshall Space Flight Center 
Richard Hendrix, professional basketball player
Mae Jemison, first African American woman in space
Dean Jones, actor
Leslie Kelley, former professional football player
Seth Kimbrough, professional BMX rider, former front man of Mortal Treason
Gary Knotts, baseball player
Alan Koch, former Major League Baseball pitcher
Cricket Lee, entrepreneur and inventor
Donald Lourie, member of the College Football Hall of Fame and former president of the Quaker Oats Company
Seybourn Harris Lynne, federal judge from 1946 to 1973
Rolando McClain, current Dallas Cowboys linebacker
Chuck Murphy, American Anglican bishop
Arthur Orr, member of the Alabama Senate
John O'Sullivan, conservative columnist and pundit
Luther Patrick, U.S. congressman from 1937 to 1943
Ray Pepper, former Major League Baseball outfielder
Josh Pearson, wide receiver and Super Bowl champion for the Tampa Bay Buccaneers
Bennie Perrin, former Arizona Cardinals safety
Charles Redding Pitt, U.S. Attorney for the U.S. District Court for the Middle District of Alabama; Democratic politician
Jerraud Powers, former NFL defensive back
Andy Price, comic artist, known for illustrating My Little Pony: Friendship Is Magic
Gary Redus, baseball player
Kristopher Reisz, novelist
Philip Rivers, former San Diego Chargers quarterback
Johnny Sandlin, musician, recording engineer, record producer
Rip Sewell, professional baseball player
Charles Christopher Sheats, U.S. congressman from 1873 to 1875
Perry Stephens, actor and singer
Mandisa Stevenson, basketball player with the Women's National Basketball Association
David Stewart, former professional football offensive tackle
Skip Stewart, aerobatic pilot
Travis S. Taylor, aerospace engineer and subject of National Geographic Channel's Rocket City Rednecks
Gordon Terry, bluegrass and country music fiddler and guitarist
Randy Thornhill, entomologist and evolutionary biologist
Carson Tinker, professional football long snapper
Judith Toups, birder and columnist for the Sun Herald of Biloxi
Phil Waldrep, minister
Don Whitmire, former professional football offensive tackle
Mildred Wolfe, artist

References

External links

 
Cities in Morgan County, Alabama
Cities in Limestone County, Alabama
Cities in Alabama
Decatur metropolitan area, Alabama
Huntsville-Decatur, AL Combined Statistical Area
County seats in Alabama
Inland port cities and towns of the United States
Populated places established in 1821
Alabama populated places on the Tennessee River